Holy Ghost is a 2014 American Christian documentary film written and directed by Darren Wilson, to take the viewer to locations around the world to see if the Holy Spirit can really lead a film.

Production
Filmmaker Darren Wilson, director of Father of Lights, Finger of God and Furious Love set out to make a movie that was completely inspired by the Holy Spirit. With no set plan, Wilson relied completely on spiritual guidance to lead him wherever the adventure is. He and his team journeyed around the world in search of nature and evidence of the Holy Spirit and to explore the role of the Holy Spirit in art, ministry and Christian life.

The filmmakers had sought $200 thousand in financing through Kickstarter and exceeding their goal.  The funding campaign began on April 18, 2014 and within 24 hours had raised $77 thousand. Within 48 hours they had reached $100 thousand, and in five days time, had exceeded $125 thousand.  By June 1, 2014 the project had received $357 thousand.

The film did not rely on a shooting script. Director Wilson "was interested in letting the film build organically instead of having a rigidly pre-determined structure or set interviews."  Production ended up with footage enough for two films. Based upon having so much footage, a sequel, Holy Ghost Reborn, was released in late 2015.

Synopsis
The film consists of interviews with religious figures as well as musicians, all speaking about the ways their faith informs their work or the miracles they have witnessed.

Cast
Film interviewees include Meredith Andrews, Heidi Baker, Reginald 'Fieldy' Arvizu, DeVon Franklin, Jake Hamilton, Bill Johnson, Brian Johnson, R.T. Kendall, Lenny Kravitz, Banning Liebscher, Jeremy Riddle, Michael W. Smith, Phil Vischer, Kim Walker-Smith, Brian 'Head' Welch, Gary Wilson, and William P. Young, among others.

Release
Wanderlust Productions is partnering with Tugg, a site the allows users to request that a film be brought to their local theaters. Once the theater approves the request, users can sell tickets on a personalized "event page."

Wanderlust CEO Braden Heckman is offering the film free for theatrical viewing due to it being fully funded through Kickstarter, and is expecting that DVD sales will bring future profits. The film raising nearly $360 thousand in 45 days represents the most money raised by a faith-based film in the history of the Kickstarter platform.

The film was shown at the Soul Survivor Summer Festival in the summer of 2014. Darren Wilson introduced it personally before the showing. The film was released September 6, 2014.

Sequel
A sequel, titled Holy Ghost: Reborn was released in 2015

See also
Korn

References

External links
 
 

2014 films
Documentary films about Christianity
Films about Christianity
American documentary films
2010s English-language films
2010s American films